= Redeye, The Photography Network =

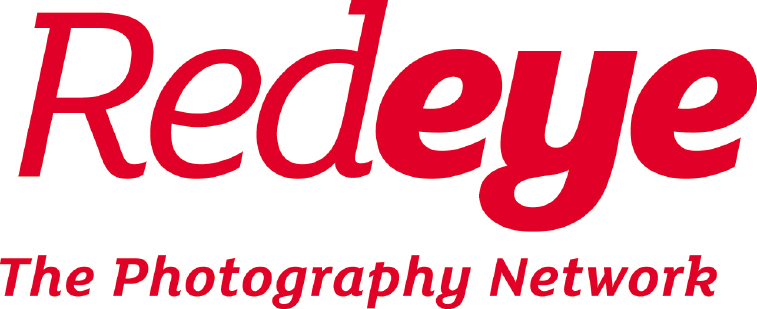
The Redeye Logo

Redeye, The Photography Network is a UK-based photography network with around 7000 subscribers, the majority of whom are full- or part-time photographers, artists and other creatives. Based in Manchester, it works with a large number of partner organisations such as galleries, universities and other photographic and arts organisations across the country to deliver its events. It has been described as "a leader among a strengthening body of nationally significant photography-focused organisations that address career development for practitioners". It closed in 2024.

== Formation ==
Redeye was created in 1998 by a group of photographers who met in Manchester to discuss research into what the region's practitioners needed in regard to North West Arts. With many facilities in demand such as darkrooms, exhibition spaces and help with legal matters, they decided that most photographers needed an environment in which they could network and learn from each other. By the beginning of 1999 these meetings had become regular. Some of the group, chaired by Len Grant, volunteered to help run the organisation. The award-winning British photographer Paul Hill gave the first of six talks that launched Redeye events in October 1999. The first paid member of staff was appointed in 2001, and a co-ordinator was selected the next year. Redeye closed on 31 July 2024.

== Non-profit status ==
Redeye receives funding support from the Arts Council of England. In March 2011 it received funding for the next four years. It also has project funding from ACE, RALP, CIDS, AGMA and a number of other organisations.

In line with its manifesto, Redeye organises various events every year including talks each year by established photographers and workshops running at beginner, intermediate and advanced levels. Monthly portfolio viewing and advice sessions are held with curators, picture editors and experienced photographers. Redeye also works in partnership with QUAD, Derby and The Buy Art Fair, held annually in Manchester. As a non-profit organisation, the aim of Redeye is to look continually at what is happening in photography and provide activities to keep it healthy.

== Projects ==
=== National Photography Symposium ===
The National Photography Symposium was established by Redeye in 2009. It has been described as "one of the must attend events of the photographic year” by Pete Jenkins, NUJ. It is a weekend of talks, workshops and events held annually, and covers every type of photography from fine art, photojournalism, community, editorial and commercial to museums, galleries, higher education and libraries. The 2009 symposium started with a punchy keynote address by Francis Hodgson of the Financial Times.
